Old Town Friends' Meetinghouse, also known as Aisquith Street Meeting or Baltimore Meeting, is a historic Quaker meeting house located at Baltimore, Maryland, United States. It is a two-story brick building which has undergone several alterations over the years.  It is the oldest religious building in the city, having been built in 1781 by contractor George Mathews.

Old Town Friends' Meetinghouse was listed on the National Register of Historic Places in 1973.

References

External links
, including photo from 1996, at Maryland Historical Trust
History and 1908 photo

Jonestown, Baltimore
Quaker meeting houses in Maryland
Religious buildings and structures in Baltimore
Properties of religious function on the National Register of Historic Places in Baltimore
Churches completed in 1781
18th-century Quaker meeting houses
Churches on the National Register of Historic Places in Maryland
Baltimore City Landmarks